Marquette High School, located in Chesterfield, Missouri, is a secondary school in the Rockwood School District of St. Louis County, Missouri. Most of the students of Marquette High School come from the school Crestview Middle School and Selvidge Middle School.

Student body
Marquette has a student body of 2,327 in 2019. The public school boundaries cover the eastern portion of Ellisville, Missouri, and almost the entirety of Ballwin, Clarkson Valley, and Chesterfield. While Marquette serves the smallest geographical area of the four Rockwood School District high schools, it has the largest student body due to population density.

A majority of students at Marquette are graduates of Crestview Middle School or Selvidge Middle School.

Athletics
Marquette fields a number of sports teams.

Boys' teams include baseball, basketball, club badminton, club ice hockey, club lacrosse, club rugby, cross country, football, golf, soccer, swimming and diving, tennis, track and field, volleyball, water polo, and wrestling.

Girls' teams include basketball, cheerleading, club badminton, cross country, dance (Mystique), field hockey, golf, lacrosse, soccer, softball, swimming and diving, track and field, and volleyball.

Each sport has varsity and junior varsity divisions, and most also have a freshman division.

Marquette is considered a Class 4A school according to the Missouri State High School Activities Association, and therefore competes at the district, sectional. Marquette competes at the conference level in the Suburban West Conference, along with rivals Lafayette High School, Lindbergh High School, Fox High School, Northwest High School, Eureka High School, Parkway South High School, Mehlville High School, and Oakville High School.

In 2017, the girls' varsity softball team won the Class 4 Missouri State Championship.

Academics
Newsweek named Marquette High School as number 739 of the Top 1,623 Public High Schools in the United States in 2010.

Marquette students outperformed the state average in the Missouri Assessment Program (MAP) testing for 2009. Marquette students were 69% proficient in biology compared to a 55% state average and 88% proficient in English compared to a 73% state average.

2014:
Average Daily Attendance Rate (ADA) – 88.0%
Students Eligible for Free or Reduced-Price Meals – 14.1%
Ratio of Students to Regular Classroom Teachers – 23
Dropout Rate – 0.5%
Total Number of Graduates – 528
Graduation Rate – 94.51%

Extracurricular activities
MHS offers many activities, groups, and organizations in addition to its academics and sports teams. Including groups such as orchestra, band, choir, and debate.

Newspaper
The school's student newspaper is a monthly publication, The Marquette Messenger.

Speech and debate
Marquette's Speech and Debate team has qualified students to MSHAA State, NFL Nationals, and NCFL Nationals. Students compete in a variety of debates and public speaking events. In 1999, Marquette student Ed Tulin won the Extemporaneous Speaking finals at NFL Nationals.

Notable alumni
 Dan Connolly, former American football player
 Michael Johnson, The Ultimate Fighter 12 finalist, MMA fighter
 Andrew Koenig, politician 
 Larissa Meek, former beauty queen
 Nikolas Schiller, blogger
 Joaquin Buckley, mixed martial artist

References

External links

High schools in St. Louis County, Missouri
Educational institutions established in 1993
Public high schools in Missouri
1993 establishments in Missouri